Xining–Chengdu high-speed railway (西宁至成都高速铁路), is a higher-speed railway line currently under construction in China.

History 
Construction of Haidong West to Huangshengguan section of the railway started on 29 October 2022.

Stations

References 

High-speed railway lines in China
High-speed railway lines under construction